The Third Half is a 1962 Soviet drama film directed by Yevgeny Karelov.

Plot 
The film shows a real football match between the Germans and the Russians, which occurred on June 22, 1942.

Cast 
 Leonid Kuravlyov as Leonid Fokin
 Vyacheslav Nevinny as Savchuk
 Gleb Strizhenov as Yevgeny Ryazantsev
 Yuri Volkov as Sokolovsky
 Vladimir Kashpur as Kirill Zaitsev
 Gennadi Yukhtin as Dugin
 Alexey Eybozhenko as Lemeshko
 Erwin Knausmüller as Major Heinz
 Georgy Svetlani as hairdresser 
 Yuriy Nazarov as Misha Skachko
 Valentina Sharykina as Vera

References

External links 
 

1962 films
1960s Russian-language films
1960s sports drama films
Soviet association football films
Sports films based on actual events
Soviet sports drama films
1962 drama films
Mosfilm films
World War II prisoner of war films